Mark Davis Pro Bass Challenge is a bass fishing video game for the GameCube and PlayStation 2.

It is an arcade-style bass fishing game that allows players to experience real world bass tournaments in a 3-D graphics format. The various tournaments follow the official rules, schedules and rating system of true American Bass Fishing tournaments. The gameplay is focused on winning matches and allowing the user to work their way up to the top, gathering equipment and rankings along the way, and compete against Mark Davis. It is the sequel to Mark Davis' The Fishing Master for Super Nintendo Entertainment System.

External links
 Mark Davis Pro Bass Challenge (PS2) | (GCN) at IGN
 Natsume website (ARCHIVED)

2003 video games
Fishing video games
Natsume (company) games
GameCube games
PlayStation 2 games
PlayStation Network games
Cancelled Xbox games
SIMS Co., Ltd. games
Sega video games
Multiplayer and single-player video games
Video games based on real people
Davis
Davis
Video games developed in Japan